Woodlands School is a secondary school in Basildon, Essex. The school currently educates more than 1600 students from Basildon and South East Essex.

Overview
The school is on a single site and is made up of one main building.
Woodlands School offers English, maths, science, languages (German, Spanish and French), geography, history, personal and social education, information and communication technologies, performing arts, media studies, design technology, art and physical education.

Previously a community school administered by Essex County Council, Woodlands School converted to academy status on 1 April 2015. However the school continues to coordinate with Essex County Council for admissions.

School life
Traditionally, a month after Year 11 students begin study leave and a month before their exam results are revealed, a prom is held for the students.(by parents)

Every academic year, Woodlands School appoints 90 Year 11 students as prefects. Each prefect is given a department to work within. From these prefects, 15 head prefects are chosen, these are also known as Senior Prefects. There is a head boy and head girl . The school has recently introduced deputy head boy and deputy head girl.

Performing Arts
Since 2005, the school has been working to expand its specialism in performing arts into the local community. Community youth organisations are now working in partnership to use funding from Essex County Council's Youth Opportunities Fund and Youth Capital Fund to complete the construction of the Theatre.

In 2006, Woodlands School was working with Creative Partnerships, The Basildon Arts Trust, Support Through Art, Loco Motion (Youth Group) and many other organisations to host an arts festival flagshipped by the surreal performance spectacular 'Einsteins Dreams.' The producers - Greg Klerkx and Sam Holdsworth - formed a new company called Nimble Fish after the success of 'Einsteins Dreams'.

Notable former pupils
Phil Gardner, Playwright and Journalist

Ofsted Report
On 16 Oct 2013 an OFSTED inspection took place which was officially released on 6 Dec 2013, which gave the school an Inadequate rating. Woodlands have since had a second ofsted inspection in 2014 and were brought out of special measures. Simon Cox was appointed Head Teacher for September 2014.
The latest report was on 19 April 2018 following an inspection on 7 March 2018. The results were as follows:

References

Secondary schools in Essex
Academies in Essex
Educational institutions established in 1957
1957 establishments in England